Bellamya pagodiformis is a species of large freshwater snail with a gill and an operculum, an aquatic gastropod mollusc in the family Viviparidae.

This species is found in the Democratic Republic of the Congo and Zambia.

References

Viviparidae
Taxonomy articles created by Polbot